The Sunshine Policy is the theoretical basis for South Korea's foreign policy towards North Korea. Its official title is The Reconciliation and Cooperation Policy Towards the North, and it is also known as The Operational Policy Towards the North and The Embracing Policy.

The policy emerged largely in the context of the growing economic gap between the two Koreas: the South was strengthening itself and experiencing economic prosperity that had begun under President Park Chung-hee in the 1970s while the North was experiencing severe economic decline and faced bankruptcy. While the government spent an excessive portion of its budget on its military and nuclear program, the people experienced widespread starvation. Sunshine Policy was aimed at mitigating this gap in economic power and restoring lost communication between the two States.

Furthermore, the background to South Korea's decision to engage North Korea through cooperation rather than maintaining a conservative stance in the past hints to a change in the domestic politics as well. According to Son Key-young, Sunshine Policy emerged ultimately as an evidence of evolving South Korean national identity since the Cold War which "ushered in an era of unprecedented confusion in South Korea over whether to define North Korea as friend or foe" (p. 4)

The policy resulted in greater political contact between the two States and some historic moments in Inter-Korean relations; the three Korean summit meetings in Pyongyang (June 2000, October 2007, and September 2018) and two meetings in Panmunjom (April 2018 and May 2018), as well as several high-profile business ventures, and brief meetings of family members separated by the Korean War.

In 2000, Kim Dae-jung was awarded the Nobel Peace Prize for his implementation of the Sunshine Policy.

Following the election of Moon Jae-in in 2017, South Korea began reconciling with North Korea once more, thus beginning a revival of the Sunshine Policy. Moon Jae-in's effort in improving inter-Korean relationship resulted in three inter-Korean summits in a year, including two summits held in Panmunjom (April 2018 and May 2018) that marked the first inter-Korean summits to be held outside of Pyongyang, and one in Pyongyang (September 2018). In recognition of Moon's endeavor in inter-Korean relationship as the first president to hold multiple summits in a year, his version of Sunshine Policy became known as "Moonshine Policy".

Overview
The main aim of the policy was to soften North Korea's attitudes towards the South by encouraging interaction and economic assistance.

The national security policy had three basic principles:
No armed provocation by the North will be tolerated;
The South will not attempt to absorb the North in any way;
The South will actively seek cooperation and reconciliation.

These principles were meant to convey the message that the South does not wish to absorb the North or to undermine its government; its goal was peaceful coexistence rather than regime change. The idea of emphasizing integration rather than absorption is in line with the attempt to refrain from all usage of the term reunification to be replaced with a more subtle expression during the term of this particular policy. Kim's administration was well aware of the prevalent fear spread within North Korea, afraid of its own identity as a state being taken away through coerced integration or any interaction with the international community.

Kim's administration also outlined two other major policy components. The first was the separation of politics and economics. In practice, this meant that the South loosened restrictions on its private sector to invest in North Korea, limiting its own involvement essentially to humanitarian aid. This was initially meant both to improve the North's economy and to induce change in the North's economic policy, though the latter goal was later (at least officially) de-emphasized.

The second component was the requirement of reciprocity from the North. Initially, it was intended that the two States would treat each other as equals, each making concessions and compromises. Perhaps most criticism of the policy stemmed from the significant backpedaling by the South on this principle in the face of unexpected rigidity from the North. It ran into trouble just two months into the Sunshine era, when South Korea requested the creation of a reunion center for divided families in exchange for fertilizer assistance; North Korea denounced this as horse trading and cut off talks. A year later, the South announced its goal would be "flexible reciprocity" based on Confucian values; as the "elder brother" of the relationship, the South would provide aid without expecting an immediate reciprocation and without requesting a specific form of reciprocity. The South also announced that it would provide humanitarian assistance without any expectations of concessions in return.

The logic of the policy was based on the belief that, even in light of its continuing shortages and economic duress, the North's government will not collapse, disintegrate, or reform itself, even if the South were to apply strong pressure. It was believed that military tensions can be lessened through bilateral and multilateral frameworks. This emphasized the normalization of political and economic relations between both the United States and North Korea as well as Japan.

Sunshine policy is often compared to the Western German Chancellor, Willy Brandt's Ostpolitik (Eastern Policy) which is a foreign policy of change through détente in the hopes of improving relations with East Germany, the Soviet Union, Poland and other Soviet Bloc countries in the early 1970s.

The term sunshine policy originates in The North Wind and the Sun, one of Aesop's fables.

Kim Dae-jung administration 1998–2003
Under Kim Dae-jung's administration the Sunshine Policy was first formulated and implemented. North-South cooperative business developments began, including a railroad and the Mount Kumgang Tourist Region, where several thousand South Korean citizens still traveled until 2008, when there was a shooting incident and the trips were cancelled. Though negotiations for them were difficult, three reunions between divided families were held.

In 2000, Kim Dae-jung and Kim Jong-il met at a summit meeting, the first conference held between leaders of the two States after the Korean War. The summit meeting was held from June 13 to 15, and at the end of the meeting, June 15th North–South Joint Declaration was adopted between the two Koreas. In the declaration, the two Koreas reached an agreement on five points, to settle the problem of independent reunification, to promote peaceful reunification, to solve humanitarian problems such as the issue of separated families, to encourage cooperation and exchange in their economy, and to have a dialogue between the North and South. After the summit, however, talks between the two States stalled. Criticism of the policy intensified and Unification Minister Lim Dong-won lost a no-confidence vote on September 3, 2001. Returning from his meeting in Washington with newly elected President Bush, Kim Dae-jung described his meeting as embarrassing while privately cursing President Bush and his hardliner approach. This meeting negated any chance of a North Korean visit to South Korea. With the Bush administration labeling North Korea as being part of the "axis of evil", North Korea renounced the non-proliferation treaty, kicked out UN inspectors, and restarted its nuclear program. In 2002 a short naval skirmish over disputed fishing territory killed six South Korean naval soldiers, further chilling relations.

Roh Moo-hyun administration 2003–08
President Roh Moo-hyun continued the policy of his predecessor, and relations on the divided peninsula warmed somewhat from 2002. In 2003, the issue of the North's possession of nuclear weapons surfaced again, with both North Korea and the United States accusing each other of breaching the Agreed Framework.

Nevertheless, Roh stayed committed to the policy and his government continued to supply the North with humanitarian aid. The two governments continued cooperation on the projects begun under Kim Dae-jung and also started the Kaesong Industrial Park, with South Korea spending the equivalent of just over $324 million on aid to the North in 2005.

There appeared to be a pro-unificational Korean trend in public attitudes during the Roh administration, though there are significant differences between generations, political groups, and regions. But the ruling Uri Party, which strongly supported it, suffered electoral defeats and in 2008 the party lost its majority in the government. The new government took a harsher stance toward North Korea.

Both the North and South Korean Governments agreed to hold a summit in Pyongyang on August 20, 2007, but this was later postponed to  October 2 to 4 due in part to an internal crisis within North Korea. Unlike his predecessor Kim Dae-jung who travelled to Pyongyang by plane, Roh travelled from Seoul to Pyongyang overland by car on October 2. Roh made a stopover at Panmunjeom and crossed the Military Demarcation Line by foot, stating that his gesture would symbolize the future reunification of Korea.

Criticism
North Korean defector and journalist Kang Chol-Hwan, who spent nine years in a North Korean prison camp, claims that Kim Dae-jung was mistaken in offering assistance to the North without any conditions of improving human rights in return. Kang disagrees with claims that the Sunshine Policy has led to a settlement of peace between North and South and questions the concept of no-strings-attached humanitarian aid, saying "it is important to understand that North Koreans are starving not because of a lack of aid from South Korea or the U.S., but because they are deprived of freedom. Giving aid only throws a line to the government, and prolongs starvation, surely a perverse outcome."

Furthermore, the policy built upon "flexible reciprocity" is often criticized to be an inappropriate ideal, bound to have realistic obstacles in inter-Korea relations. Rather than viewing North Korea as a full equal to its power, South Korea took the stance that the stronger counterpart should wait patiently until the other has gained enough power, allowing North Korea to reciprocate with time. It is theorized that the 'time-differential' in the interaction between the two nations did not aid in the restoration of trust and cooperation but led to further problems in missing transparency and the delay in fully understanding the implications of the policy, which did not benefit the mass as much as expected.

Some critics of the Sunshine Policy contend that rather than increasing the chances of reunification or undermining the regime in North Korea, it has been used instead for political gain in domestic politics in the South. They point to what they say are the continuing provocations and criminal activities committed by the North, such as the 2002 sea battle that left several South Korean sailors dead,
 the counterfeiting of American money, and what they call the North's general unwillingness to reciprocate Seoul's gestures of goodwill, as evidence that the North is interested only in receiving money and aid to prop up the communist regime. Critics also believe that, in exchange for providing humanitarian aid, the South should demand that the North return detained South Korean citizens and the remains of POWs from the Korean War. Some see the Kaesong Industrial Park as merely a way for large South Korean companies to employ cheaper labor.

Many South Korean conservative-leaning observers see the weakening of the US-South Korea alliance as being due in large part to the Sunshine Policy; they say it has led the South to favor the North's interests over those of its ally, the United States, and that it leads South Korean politicians to unreasonably mute or censor criticism of the North and even to ignore the sacrifices of its own soldiers so as to avoid upsetting the North. They say that this is harmful to the South's national interest in being allied with the United States, and actually damages the chances for a smooth and peaceful reunification. Internationally and at home, the South Korean government has been criticized for repeatedly abstaining from United Nations votes condemning the North's human rights record. The government defends the abstentions by citing the special character of inter-Korean relations.

Conspiracies have been alleged about South Korea's motivations for this policy. One North Korean defector who worked on weapons systems claimed that South Korean intelligence wanted to suppress his story, because it would shed a bad light on the policy. According to the Wall Street Journal, several U.S. senators believe his story.

Despite both the positive and negative reactions and criticism about the Sunshine Policy, there is still a debate going on today about the effectiveness of the Sunshine Policy. Even the antagonists of the Sunshine Policy were in agreement that the humanitarian emergency aid that was released from the international community, as well as South Korea, contributed to the relief of North Korea's great famine during the late 1990s. However, the ensuing cooperation policies in fact produced a backlash to goodwill argument stating that the government guided economic assistance and also direct investment instead saved or even brought back the hyper militarized North Korean regime, which because of these delays the inevitable economic reforms consequently stalled the nuclear crisis. This debate now had entered a very decisive combination. The latest supposedly alleged hydrogen bomb test seemed to very much falsify the effectiveness and also the ability to produce the desired result of positive inducement policies based on the Sunshine Policy. The idea was that South Korean economics assistance could succeed in persuading North Korea's post-communist reform and opening, which would hopefully promote peace between North Korea and South Korea. Even with all this effort and good intentions that were put into the Sunshine Policy, the policy itself began to fall apart and would soon be no more. The South Korean government officially acknowledged the reverse effects of both the current and existing inducement approaches. The President of Korea at the time President Park Geun Hye even stated during this time "Gone are the days when we caved into the North's provocations and unconditionally pumped aid into the North" This statement was given as an address to the National Assembly in South Korea. Because of this critical reappraisal, this led to the complete shutdown of the Kaeseong Industrial Complex. The Kaeseong Industrial Complex was the very last symbol of the Sunshine Policy. The building was eventually closed on February 11, 2016.

However, it can be suggested that the Sunshine Policy had some positive effect on North Korea's military and nuclear stance. Kim Suk-young mentions that North Korean government is "both strong and weak" and it is affected by "external and internal pressures" and its decisions to militarize and nuclearize or not are made due to the relationship with other countries. The author of Inside the Red Box: North Korea's Post-Totalitarian Politics, Patrick McEachern also analyzes that the North Korea's government has not decided its policies. Moreover, he stated that North Korea has never changed its behaviors to become peaceful by others' pressures, and suggests it never will. The view that the Sunshine Policy de-escalated tensions is may be given weight by comparing the number of North Korean missile and nuclear tests during Sunshine Policy period and the present unfriendly policy since Lee administration. North Korea engaged in nuclear tests five times and missile tests eight times in the eight years since 2008; by comparison, one nuclear test and three missile tests were carried out before 2008. However, this may also be indicative of the North gaining the technological capabilities to conduct extensive nuclear and missile tests circa 2008. (Refer to List of nuclear weapons tests of North Korea, List of North Korean missile tests, Kwangmyŏngsŏng-3, Kwangmyŏngsŏng-1.)

End of the Sunshine Policy: 2008–17
On October 9, 2006, before the nuclear and missile tests, South Korea suspended aid shipments to the North and put their military on high alert status. There was much concern regarding how South Korea can maintain a cooperative policy towards the North when such provocative acts occurred. Nonetheless, the government of South Korea insisted that at least some aspects of the Sunshine Policy, including the Kumgangsan Tourist Region and the Kaesong Industrial Region would continue.

From March 2008, however, the new president of the South, Lee Myung-bak and his conservative Grand National Party took a different stance to North Korea, and the South Korean government stated that any expansion of the economic cooperation at the Kaesong Industrial Region would only happen if the North resolved the international standoff over its nuclear weapons. Relations have again chilled, with North Korea making military moves such as a series of short range ship-to-ship missile tests.

After the 2009 North Korean nuclear test, the relationship between Seoul and Pyongyang was again strained. According to Jungmin Kang writing in the Bulletin of the Atomic Scientists, "Because of the post-1998 'Sunshine policy', many South Korean nongovernmental organizations and the public weren't concerned about North Korea's threats, believing that Pyongyang would never use nuclear weapons against them." South Korea's response to the nuclear test, although dampened by the recent death of its former President Roh Moo-hyun, included signing the Proliferation Security Initiative to prevent the shipment of nuclear materials to North Korea.

In November 2010, the South Korean Unification Ministry officially declared the Sunshine Policy a failure, thus bringing the policy to an end.

Return to the Sunshine Policy: 2017–present

Moon Jae-in was elected President of South Korea in 2017, promising to return South Korea to the Sunshine Policy. 2018 and 2019 saw a rapid acceleration in talks between the two countries, seeking inter-Korean dialogue, denuclearization and demilitarization, and eventual unification of the peninsula.

On 27 April 2018, the first of three summits took place between Moon and Kim in the South Korean side of the Joint Security Area inside of the Peace House. The summit ended with both countries pledging to work towards complete denuclearization of the Korean Peninsula. They also vowed to declare an official end to the Korean War within a year. The Panmunjom Declaration was signed by leaders of both countries, which laid out the goals of inter-Korean dialogue and peace negotiations. Both countries called for the end of longstanding military activities in the region of the Korean border and an eventual reunification of the peninsula. Additionally, the leaders agreed to work together to connect and modernize their railway systems.

Moon and Kim met a second time on 26 May, this time on the North Korean side of the Joint Security Area in the Unification Pavilion. This meeting was unannounced to the media prior, but focused on discussions around Kim's upcoming summit with United States President Donald Trump. The summit also resulted on an agreement to reopen a jointly operated liaison office in Kaesong that the South had shut down in February 2016 after a North Korean nuclear test. The office was operational from September 2018 to June 2020 and held many inter-Korean talks, until the building was demolished by North Korea amid rising tensions.

From 18–21 September, delegations from both countries met in Pyongyang, North Korea for the third and final summit between Moon and Kim. The summit resulted in agreement in a number of areas, including the removal of land mines and guard posts along areas of the Joint Security Area. North Korea agreed to dismantle their nuclear complex in the presence of international experts if the U.S. takes correlative action, although this never occurred. Moon became the first South Korean leader to give a public address in North Korea.

South Korea announced that it would not conduct annual military exercises with the US in September 2018, and would also stop its own drills in the Yellow Sea, in order to not provoke North Korea and to continue a peaceful dialog. On 1 July 2018 South and North Korea resumed ship-to-ship radio communication, which could prevent accidental clashes between South and North Korean military vessels around the Northern Limit Line (NLL) in the West (Yellow) Sea. On 17 July 2018, South and North Korea fully restored their military communication line on the western part of the peninsula.

Cultural exchanges were also an important aspect of normalizing relations. In preparation for the 2018 Winter Olympics, held in South Korea, North Korean leader Kim Jong-un proposed sending a delegation of athletes and officials. In the opening ceremonies, North and South Korea marched together under the Korean Unification Flag. At the games the two countries fielded a united women's ice hockey team. Apart from their athletic delegation, North Korea sent an unprecedented high-level political delegation. This delegation was headed by Kim Yo-jong, sister of Kim Jong-un, and President Kim Yong-nam, and included musical performers like the Samjiyon Orchestra. The arrival of Kim Yo-jong to the games marked the first time since the Korean War that a member of the Kim ruling dynasty entered South Korean territory. The delegation extended President Moon an invitation to visit North Korea.  On 1 April 2018, South Korean K-pop stars performed a concert in Pyongyang entitled "Spring is Coming", which was attended by Kim Jong-un and his wife. In May 2018, North Korea adjusted its time zone to match the South's  while the South began removing propaganda loudspeakers from the border area in line with the Panmunjom Declaration.

In recognition of President Moon Jae-in's attempts to restart engagement with North Korea and cooperate with Washington, Moon's return to the Sunshine Policy is sometimes referred to as "Moonshine Policy". While Moon is commended for his attempts at seeking peace for the peninsula, increased military hostility from South Korea and the United States has soured inter-Korean relations since 2019. Denuclearization of North Korea has also made little progress since 2019, while weapons testing has increased.

See also
Korean reunification
North Korea–South Korea relations
Korean Peninsula Energy Development Organization
Hyundai Asan
Nordpolitik
Liberalism in South Korea
Progressive Party (South Korea, 1956)

References

Further reading
Kang, David C, "They Think They're Normal: Enduring Questions and New Research on North Korea," International Security, Vol. 36, No. 3, Winter 2011/12, pp. 142–171.
Oberdorfer, Don. The Two Koreas : A Contemporary History. Addison-Wesley, 1997, 472 pages, 
Levin, Norman D. "Shape of Korea's Future: South Korean attitudes toward unification and long-term security issues." RAND, 1999, 48 pages,

External links
Sunshine Policy in a Nutshell , a publication of the Federation of American Scientists.
Sunshine policy warms old rivals, The Guardian, 10 June 2000
The Bush Administration and the Korean Peninsula: Interview with Dr. Suh Sang-mook, Stanford Journal of East Asian Affairs, Spring 2001, Volume 1.
Terrorism Eclipses The Sunshine Policy: Inter-Korean Relations and the United States, Asia Society, March 2002
The Cost of Sunshine, Time, 3 February 2003
Excerpt from Rand Corporation monograph
Despite U.S. Attempts, N. Korea Anything but Isolated, Washington Post, 12 May 2005
No sunshine yet over North Korea, Asia Times, 13 May 2005
South Korea Formally Declares End to Sunshine Policy, Voice of America, 18 November 2010

Foreign policy doctrines
1998 in South Korea
1998 in international relations
North Korea–South Korea relations
History of liberalism
Pacifism
Left-wing nationalism in South Korea
Liberalism in South Korea
Korean nationalism
Kim Dae-jung
1998 in North Korea
History of diplomacy